The 1945 Ukrainian Cup was a football knockout competition conducting by the Football Federation of the Ukrainian SSR and was known as the Ukrainian Cup.

Competition schedule

Unknown round games

First elimination round 
The main date for games was on 27 September 1945.

Second elimination round 
The main date for games was on 7 October 1945.

Third elimination round 
The main date for games was on 14 October 1945.

Fourth elimination round 
The main date for games was on 21 October 1945.

Quarterfinals 
The main date for games was on 28 October 1945.

Semifinals 
All games were played in Kyiv.

Final

Top goalscorers

See also 
 Soviet Cup
 Ukrainian Cup

Notes

References

External links 
 Information source 

1945
Cup
1945 domestic association football cups